Kathleen Herles (born November 13, 1990) is an American voice actress best known for being the original voice of Dora on Dora the Explorer for the first four seasons from 2000–2007 and Go, Diego, Go!. She was also known to be one of the kids to appear on Sesame Street.

Herles was born in the Queens borough of New York City. Her parents are from Lima, Peru. She has studied ballet, tap, jazz, drama, and voice. She takes piano lessons. She was discovered by talent manager Shirley Grant of Shirley Grant Management at a talent and modeling convention when she was 4 years old. She graduated from Pace University in 2012.

In 2007, Herles retired from doing the voice for Dora The Explorer and was replaced by Caitlin Sanchez.

Herles' final time providing the voice of Dora the Explorer, along with the original cast of Go, Diego, Go! (like Jake T. Austin), was in the feature-length TV special, Diego's Great Polar Bear Rescue, which aired on September 18, 2009.

Awards and nominations
In 2007, Herles was nominated for an Imagen Award for Best Television Actress.

She was nominated in 2007 and 2008 for a NAACP Image Award for NAACP Image Award for Outstanding Performance in a Youth/Children's Series or Special.

References

External links
 

1990 births
American voice actresses
American child actresses
Living people
Actresses from New York City
American people of Peruvian descent
Hispanic and Latino American actresses
Pace University alumni
People from Queens, New York
21st-century American actresses
People from Deer Park, New York